Daniel Hyde (born 25 September 1975) is a British actor most notable for his roles as Scott Anderson in Hollyoaks and Jason Wilding in Family Affairs.

He graduated from the Webber Douglas Academy of Dramatic Art in 1999 and his other television credits include The Bill, Casualty and London's Burning.

External links 
Insanity Talent represent Daniel Hyde
Daniel Hyde's CV at Insanity

1975 births
Living people
English male soap opera actors
Alumni of the Webber Douglas Academy of Dramatic Art